Alexander Hamilton Revell Sr. (January 6, 1858 – March 13, 1931) was an American businessman from Chicago who in 1876 founded the Alexander H. Revell & Co. and built it into a large furniture retailer.

Biography
Alexander Revell was born in Chicago on January 6, 1858. He worked at a variety of jobs while attending night schools.

He married Maude B. Richardson in 1889 and they had one child.

He was a charter member of the Field Museum of Natural History who sponsored a 1927 trip to Alaska to collect Kodiak bear specimens. He was also a member of the Chicago Board of Education and a director of the World's Columbian Exposition.

Revell died by falling or jumping from his bathroom window on the 9th floor of the Drake Hotel on March 13, 1931. He was buried at Rosehill Cemetery.

References

External links
 

1858 births
1931 deaths
19th-century American businesspeople
Burials at Rosehill Cemetery
Businesspeople from Chicago